Rachelia is a genus of skipper butterflies in the family Hesperiidae.

Species
Rachelia extrusus C. & R. Felder, 1867

References
Natural History Museum Lepidoptera genus database
Rachelia at funet

Trapezitinae
Hesperiidae genera